French football club SC Bastia's 1999–2000 season. Finished 10th place in league. Top scorer of the season, including 12 goals in 11 league matches have been Frédéric Née. Was eliminated to Coupe de France end of 64, the Coupe de la Ligue was able to be among the semi final.

Transfers

In 
Summer
 Ousmane Soumah from Lorient
 Dan Petersen from Anderlecht
 Zoumana Camara from Empoli
 Piotr Świerczewski from Gamba Osaka
 Lilian Nalis from Le Havre
 Yann Lachuer from Paris SG

Out 
Summer
 François Modesto to Cagliari
 Nebojša Krupniković to OFK Belgrade
 Andrés Grande to Ferro Carril Oeste
 Mariusz Piekarski to Legia Warszawa
 Paulo Alves to Uniao Leiria
 Laurent Fournier to retired
 Sébastien Perez to Marseille

Winter
 No.

Squad

French Division 1

League table

Results summary

Results by round

Matches

Coupe de France

Coupe de la Ligue

Statistics

Top scorers

League assists

References 

SC Bastia seasons
Bastia